Emily Wachtel is a producer and screenwriter. She originated and produced The Last Movie Stars, the recently released six-part documentary film which chronicles the lives and careers of Paul Newman and Joanne Woodward. The film was directed by Ethan Hawke and executive produced by Martin Scorsese. Wachtel also co-wrote, produced and acted in the semi-autobiographical film Lucky Them starring Toni Collette, Thomas Haden Church, Johnny Depp, and Oliver Platt.

Life and career

Wachtel used her author's pseudonym, Ellie Klug, as the name of her main character in Lucky Them, as well as her own experience in music and dating scenes. Her pseudonym appeared in several publications and for a column in the "Fairfield Weekly." The Indie film premiered at the September 2013 Toronto International Film Festival to positive reviews from outlets such as Variety, The Huffington Post, Screen Daily, and The Hollywood Reporter.

Wachtel executive produced the documentary, "Shepard and Dark," on playwright, actor, and director Sam Shepard which was featured at The Cannes International Film Festival in May 2013.

In 2016, Wachtel produced a music video of the song "Let Me Be Your Girl" for singer songwriter Rachael Yamagata which was directed by Josh Radnor, and starred actress Allison Janney.

Wachtel serves on the board of the Greenwich International Film Festival, which hosted a June, 2014 "hometown premiere" of Lucky Them in her hometown of Stamford, Connecticut.

Wachtel serves on the international Board of Governors for SeriousFun Children's Network, a non-profit consisting of Paul Newman's camps for children with cancer and other blood-related diseases.

Filmography

References

External links 
 

1965 births
Living people
Actresses from Connecticut
American film actresses
American television actresses
Sarah Lawrence College alumni
21st-century American actresses
21st-century American women writers